Édouard Didier (born 2 December 1939) is a Luxembourgian former fencer. He competed in the individual and team foil events at the 1960 Summer Olympics.

References

External links
 

1939 births
Living people
People from Sedan, Ardennes
Luxembourgian male foil fencers
Olympic fencers of Luxembourg
Fencers at the 1960 Summer Olympics
Sportspeople from Ardennes (department)